Judith Jeptum Korir (born 12 December 1995) is a Kenyan marathon runner.

Korir won the 2021 Abu Dhabi marathon in a time of 2:22:30.  She secured victory at the 2022 Paris Marathon, setting a new course record and a new personal best time of 2:19:48.

Korir was selected by Kenya to run in the 2022 World Athletics Championships – Women's marathon in which she finished second to earn the silver medal in a new personal best time of 2:18:20.

Personal bests
 10 kilometres – 33:02 (Eldoret 2019)
 Half marathon – 1:05:28 (Ras Al Khaimah 2022)
 Marathon – 2:18:20 (Eugene, OR 2022)

References

1995 births
Living people
Kenyan female long-distance runners
Kenyan female marathon runners
World Athletics Championships athletes for Kenya
World Athletics Championships medalists
20th-century Kenyan women
21st-century Kenyan women
Paris Marathon female winners